USCGC Eagle (WIX-327), formerly the Horst Wessel and also known as the Barque Eagle, is a  barque used as a training cutter for future officers of the United States Coast Guard. She is the seventh Coast Guard cutter to bear the name in a line dating back to 1792, including the Revenue Cutter Eagle.

Each summer, Eagle deploys with cadets from the United States Coast Guard Academy and candidates from the Officer Candidate School for periods ranging from a week to two months. These voyages fulfill multiple roles. The primary mission is training the cadets and officer candidates, but the ship also performs a public relations role for the Coast Guard and the United States. Often, Eagle makes calls at foreign ports as a goodwill ambassador.

The ship was built as the German sail training ship Horst Wessel in 1936; it served to train German sailors in sail techniques until decommissioned at the start of World War II. The vessel was given anti-aircraft armament and re-commissioned in 1942. At the end of the war, Horst Wessel was taken by the U.S. as war reparations.

Origin as Horst Wessel 

Eagle commenced its existence in Nazi Germany as Horst Wessel, a ship of the Gorch Fock class. Horst Wessel was an improvement on the original design. She was larger in dimension and her spars were all steel, unlike Gorch Focks wooden yards. SSS Horst Wessel began life as Schiff ("ship") 508 at Blohm & Voss in Hamburg, Germany in 1936. Her keel was laid on 15 February, she was launched on 13 June, completed on 16 September, and commissioned on 17 September. She was the second ship in the class to be built, following the class namesake Gorch Fock. Rudolf Hess gave the speech at her launch in the presence of Adolf Hitler, and Horst Wessel's mother christened the new ship with a bottle of champagne. The name was given in tribute to SA leader Horst Wessel, who had been accorded martyr status by the Nazi Party. He also wrote the song which came to be known as "Horst-Wessel-Lied", which was later used as the Nazi party's anthem.

SSS Horst Wessel served as the flagship of the Kriegsmarine sail training fleet, which consisted of Gorch Fock, and Horst Wessel. ( was also built in 1937 for the Romanian Navy, and work began on a fifth ship called Herbert Norkus, but was stopped with the outbreak of war.) Horst Wessel was commanded by Captain August Thiele, a previous Captain of Gorch Fock, and it was homeported in Kiel. In the three years before World War II, she undertook numerous training cruises in the North Atlantic waters, sailing with trainee groups consisting of both future officers and future petty officers. On 21 August 1938, Adolf Hitler visited the ship and sailed for approximately one hour before departing. Later that year, Horst Wessel and Albert Leo Schlageter undertook a four-month voyage to the Caribbean and visited St. Thomas and Venezuela. Along the way, they caught numerous sharks and turtles at sea and kept ducks enclosed on deck to provide fresh eggs.

Horst Wessel was decommissioned in 1939 with the onset of World War II, but served as a docked training ship in Stralsund for the marine branch of the Hitler Youth until her recommissioning as an active Navy sail training vessel in 1942. Numerous weapons were installed throughout the decks, including two 20 mm anti-aircraft guns on the bridge wings, two on the foredeck, and two 20 mm Flakvierling quad mounts on the waist. From late 1942 through early 1945, she sailed on numerous training deployments in the Baltic sea with cadets fresh out of basic training. On 14 November 1944, accompanied by Albert Leo Schlageter, Horst Wessel was sailing in rough weather, when, near the island of Rügen, Albert Leo Schlageter hit a mine that caused extensive damage to its starboard bow. Horst Wessel took Albert Leo Schlageter in a stern tow to keep her from running aground until larger ships could arrive the next day to assist.

In April 1945, after the last German cadet class had departed, Horst Wessel departed Rügen with a group of German refugees on board. She sailed to Flensburg where Kapitänleutnant Barthold Schnibbe surrendered to the British, and the ship ran up the Union Jack. Horst Wessel was ordered to Bremerhaven and tied to a temporary pier, and much of its equipment was stripped. At the end of World War II, the four German sailing vessels then extant were distributed to various nations as war reparations. Horst Wessel was won by the United States in a drawing of lots with the Soviet and British navies, and requested by the United States Coast Guard Academy's Superintendent. On 15 May 1946, she was commissioned by CDR Gordon McGowan into the United States Coast Guard as the U.S. Coast Guard Cutter Eagle. In June 1946, a U.S. Coast Guard crew sailed her from Bremerhaven to Orangeburg, New York—through a hurricane—assisted by Kapitänleutnant Schnibbe and many of his crew who were still aboard. The German volunteer crew was disembarked at Camp Shanks and Eagle proceeded to her new home port of New London, Connecticut.

Early afloat training at the U.S. Coast Guard Academy 
Training at sea on a sailing vessel has always been a part of the Coast Guard Academy curriculum. In 1877, the first cadets to enroll in the United States Revenue Cutter Service, the predecessor to the U.S. Coast Guard, undertook their training on board the Revenue Cutter James C. Dobbin. In 1878, James C. Dobbin was replaced by the Revenue Cutter Salmon P. Chase. Cadets lived on board the ships (physical classrooms were not even established on shore until 1900), took classes on board in the winters when tied to a pier in New Bedford, Massachusetts or Arundel Cove, Maryland, and sailed on training deployments during the summers. During this time, Salmon P. Chase undertook numerous voyages to Europe. From 1890 to 1894, Salmon P. Chase suspended operations as there was a surplus of graduates from the United States Naval Academy. In 1907, Salmon P. Chase was decommissioned and transferred to the Marine Hospital Service. She was replaced by the Revenue Cutter Itasca, a former Naval Academy training vessel.

In 1922, Itasca was determined to be too small for the cadet corps, and was decommissioned and scrapped. She was then replaced by the three-masted barquentine Alexander Hamilton, a former Navy gunboat from the Spanish–American War. Alexander Hamilton was in service at the Coast Guard Academy until 1930; after her decommissioning in 1944, Alexander Hamiltons mainmast was returned to New London and served as the Academy's flagpole until 1954. During the 1930s, the Academy did not have a resident sailing vessel for cadet training. In 1939, the Danish Navy's sail training vessel  was in New York City to take part in the 1939 World's Fair. After World War II broke out, the ship was offered to the U.S. government and transferred to the Coast Guard Academy, where she was commissioned as USCGC Danmark and served as the cadet training ship until 26 September 1945, when she was returned to the Danish government.

Sail training during these early years of the Coast Guard Academy is remarkably similar to the program on board Eagle today. An 1886 contemporary described the training experience on board Salmon P. Chase as such:

Training at sea on board Eagle 

Eagles primary mission is to develop the future officers of the U.S. Coast Guard. Since 1946, she has deployed each summer with cadets on board as part of their Academy curriculum. As soon as the cadets complete their final examinations in May of each year,  Eagle departs with roughly half of the third class cadets (the rising sophomores) and a small contingent of first class cadet cadre (rising seniors who lead the third class cadets). Six weeks later, the cadets on board rotate to other training locations while the second half of the third class cadets meet the ship and begin their training. After their five weeks on board, the third and first class cadets depart for their summer leave, and the fourth class cadets (the rising freshmen; also known as swabs) report aboard in two or three groups for one week of sail training each. Like the third class cadets, the fourth class cadets are led by a group of second class cadet cadre (the rising juniors). Eagle typically returns to New London at the end of the summer, returning the cadets to the Coast Guard Academy one or two weeks before the academic school year begins. All cadets at the Academy will normally complete a minimum of six weeks on board Eagle during their fourth and third class years, and have the opportunity to return as cadre if they chose to do so during their second and first class years. The current schedule also includes two 2-3 week voyages in the Spring and Fall with the semiannual Coast Guard Officer Candidate School classes.

Eagle has a standing permanent crew of seven officers and 50 enlisted members; on training missions, she takes on a variety of temporary crew and sails with an average complement of 12 officers, 68 crew, and up to 150 trainees. While on board, cadets and officer candidates receive a large amount of instruction from the crew. They take classes on numerous subjects that are key to life at sea, including navigation, seamanship, ship and boat maneuvering, line handling, sailing, first aid, weather patterns, damage control, engineering, career development, and more. They also stand watches in the engine room, on the bridge, on deck, in the scullery and galley, and during port calls, they assist the public by giving tours. The trainees are expected to qualify in a variety of watchstations applicable to their level of experience; for example, third class cadets complete their 'helm and lookout' qualification while upper-class cadets work to qualify in leadership positions on the bridge and in the engine room. At the same time, trainees are given a rigorous set of nautical tasks they must complete. One common training task involves the Eagle crew covering all Global Positioning System receivers on board and requiring trainees to navigate between ports using sextants, a compass, and the tools of celestial navigation.

On a normal training day, Eagle will set 'sail stations' once or twice and all cadets and crew members will take their positions on deck to set or douse sail, or conduct a sailing maneuver such as tacking or wearing. At the beginning of a deployment with a new group of trainees, these complicated maneuvers are closely managed and led by the crew, but as the trainees become more experienced and learn how to work the sails and lines, they slowly take over leadership of these and other evolutions and begin to lead themselves. The goal of the crew is to help the trainees develop and mold into a cohesive team and a group of leaders, enabling the crew to take a step back, assist where needed, and ensure all personnel are kept safe.

In March 1998 Eagle trained her first and only class of future Coast Guard enlisted members, taking on the boot camp company November-152. The members flew from the United States Coast Guard Training Center Cape May in Cape May, New Jersey to Roosevelt Roads Naval Station in Puerto Rico. After just three days of training on shore, Eagle sailed to Fort-de-France, Martinique; La Guaira, Venezuela; and Cartagena, Colombia. The future seamen and firemen then finally returned home to New London for boot camp graduation. In recent years, when able to do so, Eagle has supplemented the officer candidate deployments with future petty officers undergoing training classes at Coast Guard Training Center Yorktown to become Boatswain's mates. Additionally, since 2013, when the National Oceanic and Atmospheric Administration (NOAA) moved its Officer Candidate Training program to the Coast Guard Academy, NOAA Officer Candidates have taken part in the Spring and Fall Officer Candidate deployments.

"America's Tall Ship" 

Eagles secondary mission is to represent the U.S. Coast Guard and the United States to the public and the international community. In this role, she has earned the nickname of "America's Tall Ship." During her many years of service as a Coast Guard cutter, she has traveled to harbors throughout the United States and around the world. Among her various training deployments, Eagle has participated in various Tall Ship races and events, including the Operation Sail events of 1964, 1976, 1986, 1992, 2000 and 2012. Most notably, Eagle led the parade of ships into New York Harbor during the American Bicentennial OpSail of 1976. In the summer of 1974, during the kick-off race for OpSail 1976 (from Newport, Rhode Island to Boston, Massachusetts), the participating ships encountered heavy weather and a number of other ships dropped out.

In 1972, at the request of the West German government, Eagle returned to Germany for the first time since 1946 and visited the port of Kiel where she had formerly moored on numerous occasions as Horst Wessel. The visit included a five-day race against Gorch Fock II, Germany's replacement for the Gorch Fock built in 1958, and the Polish sail training vessel Dar Pomorza, which was also taken from Germany as war booty. Three days into the race, numerous sails onboard Eagle ripped and had to be removed, and Eagle lost the race. Eagle again returned to Germany in 1977, 1988, 1996 (her 60th anniversary), 2005, and 2011 (her 75th anniversary).

In 1975, Eagle transported the remains of Hopley Yeaton, the first Revenue Cutter Service officer commissioned by President George Washington, from Lubec, Maine to the Coast Guard Academy where he was laid to rest at the Captain Hopley Yeaton Memorial.

In 1984, under the leadership of Captain Ernst Cummings and Boatswain Richard 'Red' Shannon, Eagle took part in a tall ship's race with the Dar Pomorza, the Venezuelan ship Simón Bolívar, and the  British barque Marques. On 2 June, after the weather worsened, Captain Cummings ordered sail taken in. As the deck watch prepared to go aloft to furl sail, Eagle was hit by a squall with  winds, forcing her into a 45-50 degree heel. Boatswain Shannon ordered the rudder to 'right full' and the ship slowly righted herself.

At the personal invitation of Australian Prime Minister Robert Hawke, in September 1987, Eagle undertook a yearlong deployment to Australia from her home at the Coast Guard Academy. During this voyage Academy instructors were embarked to conduct the cadets' classes while underway. The trip involved stops at numerous Pacific islands and visits to the Australian ports of Lord Howe Island, Newcastle, Brisbane, Hobart, Sydney, and Manly, encompassing more than eight months away from her homeport of New London, Connecticut.

From 1996 to 1999, Eagle was commanded by Captain Robert J. Papp, Jr., who went on to serve as the Commandant of the Coast Guard from 2010 to 2014.

In 2005, as part of the Trafalgar 200 International Fleet Review in the Solent off southern England celebrating the 200 year anniversary of Admiral Horatio Nelson's victory at the Battle of Trafalgar, Eagle was one of a number of tall ships from several nations to be reviewed by Queen Elizabeth II, along with the U.S. Navy warship . Later that summer, Eagle returned to Bremerhaven for the first time since World War II and received an enthusiastic welcome.

In 2010 she participated in Velas Sudamerica 2010, a historical Latin American tour by eleven tall ships to celebrate the bicentennial of the first national governments of Argentina and Chile.

In 2012, as part of the Tall Ships Challenge hosted by Tall Ships America in conjunction with Operation Sail 2012, Eagle took part in a nail-biting two-day race off the coast of Nova Scotia with a large group of tall ships from all over North America. After 32 hours of calm waters, the wind freshened and then began to blow, and Eagle won the race in a dramatic fashion.

Design 

Eagle is slightly larger than her sister ship Gorch Fock. Overall Eagle displaces 1,824 tons. The hull is riveted Krupp steel four-tenths of an inch thick (10 mm). There are two full-length steel decks with a platform deck below.

Auxiliary propulsion was originally provided by a single Burmeister & Wain diesel with reduction gear producing  horsepower. She was refitted with a  Caterpillar D399 V16 diesel engine in 1980, and again with a  MTU 8V 4000 in 2018, providing speeds up to 17 knots (19.5 mph/31 km/h) under power.

There are two  Caterpillar generators that can be run by themselves or in parallel together. She carries a reverse osmosis system that replenishes the ship's fresh water supply at sea.

Eagle has a three-masted barque sailing rig, with two masts fully rigged with 'square sails' and one mast with only 'fore-and-aft' sails. The large sail area of the 'square sails' provide much of the power while the 'fore-and-aft' sails enable superior maneuverability. To protect sails from chafing, Eagle uses baggywrinkle extensively. The top three yards of the fore- and main masts are moveable, and are kept lowered when not sailing to lower the ship's center of gravity. In addition, the top portion of the fore- and main masts, known as the topgallant masts, may be housed (lowered) by 13 ft when not under sail in order to sail underneath low bridges. Eagles fastest point of sail is when her yards are braced sharp (or pivoted as much as they can be) and the relative wind (the wind you feel standing on the ship as it moves) is approximately 5-10 degrees aft of the windward leech of the sail. When fully braced, Eagle can sail about 75 degrees off of the true wind. Eagles propeller shaft can also be de-clutched from the engine so the propeller can freewheel, thus lessening drag while under sail.

The main helm station, also known as the triple helm, is connected via mechanical shaft linkage to the steering gear located in the "captain's coffin" on the fantail along with the emergency, or "trick" wheel (also referred to as aft steering). Three turns of the main helm station equal one degree of rudder turn. That is why six persons are used to steer during heavy weather and while operating in restricted waterways. The emergency, or "trick" wheel is a single wheel that turns at a rate of one revolution to one degree of rudder turn. It thus requires more force to turn.

The ship has undergone numerous refits since she was acquired by the Coast Guard in 1946. Sometime during the 1950s, Captain Carl Bowman replaced Eagles split spanker on the mizzenmast with a single sail. During the 1980s, under Captain David Wood, the split spanker was returned as it afforded reduced weather helm and allowed the helmsman to turn away (or 'fall off') from the wind more easily.

On 27 January 1967, Eagle departed the Coast Guard Yard maintenance facility at Curtis Bay (near Baltimore, Maryland). Shortly after 1:30 PM Eagle collided with the motor vessel Philippine Jose Abad Santos. Fortunately, nobody on either ship was injured. Eagle returned to the shipyard and underwent repairs.

On 1 July 1972, the ship was returning to her berth at the Coast Guard Academy in New London at the midpoint of her annual summer cadet training deployment when she was involved in another serious accident. Despite extensive precautions, as the ship passed below the Gold Star Memorial Bridge and a new twin bridge being built parallel to it, her foremast and mainmast caught on some safety netting slung below the new bridge that had not been fully secured. Both masts were snapped off above the crosstrees (about seven-eighths of the way up each mast), and the upper parts were left hanging from the remaining upright parts of the masts. As a result, the ship had to undergo emergency repairs. The Electric Boat facility in Groton, Connecticut was able to repair the masts in time for Eagles planned deployment to Europe; she set sail just three and a half weeks later on 24 July.

1976 brought significant changes to Eagle. The Coast Guard added their "racing stripe" and the words 'Coast Guard' to her otherwise unadorned white hull. In addition, the eagle figurehead on the bowsprit of the ship was replaced. The original eagle figurehead now resides on display in the U.S. Coast Guard Museum in Waesche Hall at the Coast Guard Academy. Finally, in 1976, Eagle received Captain Paul Welling, her first permanent Commanding Officer since Captain Barthold Schnibbe of the German Navy. Previous Commanding Officers had been drawn temporarily from officers assigned to the Academy.

By 1979, the Coast Guard had developed plans for an extensive refit at the Coast Guard Yard facility. From 1979 to 1983, Eagle visited the yard all four winters between summer deployments. During these maintenance availability periods her original 1936 Burmeister & Wain diesel engine, known affectionately as 'Elmer,' along with the generators and evaporators, were replaced by modern equipment ('Elmer' was given to the Portuguese vessel , the former Albert Leo Schlageter, to provide spare parts for her engine). This made the engine room more spacious, less noisy, and far cooler in temperature. The new engine could be controlled directly from the bridge through a pressurized air line and responded instantly, rather than after a 30-second delay common with the original engine. Additional watertight compartmentalization was also added (previously, there had been only seven). This compartmentalization included closing in cadet berthing areas, eliminating separate upper-class (fixed three-tier bunks) and lower-class (hammock) berthing and made the ship better able to accommodate male and female cadets. Crew habitability was greatly improved with the installation of new ventilation and air conditioning systems, fresh water showers, and fresh water clothes washing machines. An enclosed pilothouse was built around the exhaust funnel on the quarterdeck. Electronic equipment (e.g., radar, navigation, and radio equipment) was updated as well, and much of it was moved from the radio room into the new pilothouse. The helm station remained unsheltered and unchanged. Finally, the entire teak deck was replaced, and the steel beneath it was found to be badly corroded and had to be repaired as well. For two summers, Eagle sailed without parts of her teak deck. It was discovered that the teak deck is one of the keys to 'stiffening' the longitudinal strength of the ship.

In 2014, Eagle began a similar refit. The ship's crew temporarily shifted its administrative homeport to Baltimore and began an extensive four-year service life extension project. Each year, Eagle spent six months in the yard and six months sailing with trainees. The goal of this maintenance overhaul was for the ship to remain safe and viable as the Coast Guard's premier training vessel well into the 21st century. Significant work was conducted on the HVAC system, engine room, hull, and other systems. Its auxiliary propulsion unit was replaced in the winter of 2017–2018. After the refit was completed, Eagle returned to her traditional homeport of New London, Connecticut.

Eagle Commanding Officers 

CAPT Jessica Rozzi-Ochs serves as Eagle's first female and 30th overall Commanding Officer, assuming command from CAPT Michael Turdo on 24 June, 2022. Turdo oversaw Eagle and her valuable diplomatic and training mission during the COVID-19 pandemic, limiting cruise opportunities and ports of call. 

CDR Gordon P. McGowan served as the first American commanding officer of Eagle, relieving German Kapitänleutnant Berthold Schnibbe and commissioning her in the US Coast Guard as "Cutter Eagle" on May 15, 1946. McGowan and his crew of 6 USCG officers and 55 enlisted sailors would become Eagle's plankowners, responsible for making her seaworthy for trans-Atlantic passage, and deliver her to New London with a combined American and former Horst Wessel crew who volunteered to help train the American sailors in traditional rigged sailing.

Rozzi-Ochs joins a distinguished list of Eagle commanders such as ADM Robert J. Papp Jr., who went on to serve as the 24th Commandant of the Coast Guard from 2010 to 2014, and VADM James C. Irwin, who served as vice commandant from 1986 to 1988. Horst Wessel's first commander, German VADM August Thiele would go on to earn the Knight's Cross for his command of Kampfgruppe V.

In popular culture 
Eagle has a significant presence in the Nantucket series of books by S. M. Stirling, in which she is visiting the island of Nantucket when a mysterious "Event" transports the entire island, including Eagle and her crew, back in time from 17 March 1998 to the year 1250 BC. Sent across the Atlantic Ocean to barter for the grain and livestock the time-lost Nantucketers need to survive through their first winter, her arrival off the south coast of Bronze Age England leads the natives to name her crew (and, by extension, the rest of the Island's population) as 'The Eagle People'. Although the Eagle described in the books is based on the real-world ship, the named crew members are all fictional.

Cruises by the USCGC Eagle 
As part of its training mission, the Eagle embarks on annual cruises around the world, primarily to locations in the Americas and Europe. The following is a list of cruises conducted between 1946 and 2022.

See also 
NRP Sagres, Gorch Fock I, and Mircea, sister ships to Eagle
Gorch Fock (1958), training ship of the German Navy
List of large sailing vessels
Kiel Week

References

Sources

Further reading

External links 

Eagle homepage by the U.S. Coast Guard Academy

On the Wings of Eagle, 1999 video documentary on YouTube

Gorch Fock-class sailing ships
Historic American Engineering Record in Connecticut
Individual sailing vessels
Tall ships of the United States
Training ships of the United States Coast Guard
United States Coast Guard Academy
Naval academies
Three-masted ships
1936 ships
Ships built in Hamburg
Sail training ships